The 38th Guillermo Mendoza Memorial Scholarship Foundation Box Office Entertainment Awards (GMMSF-BOEA) is a part of the annual awards in the Philippines held on May 13, 2008. The award-giving body honors Filipino actors, actresses and other performers' commercial success, regardless of artistic merit, in the Philippine entertainment industry.

Winners selection
The winners are chosen from the Top 10 Philippine films of 2007, top-rating shows in Philippine television, top recording awards received by singers, and top gross receipts of concerts and performances.

Awards ceremony
On May 13, 2008 at RCBC Plaza, Ayala Avenue in Makati, Philippines, the 38th Box Office Entertainment Awards night was held. The event was aired on May 17, 7pm at NBN 4 - Net 25.

Hosts of the night
Kim Chiu and Gabby Concepcion

Presenters and performers

Bea Saw and AJ Dee
Makisig Morales
John Wayne Sace and Alex Gonzaga
Robert Woods and Saicy Aguila
Gian Magdangal
Aicelle Santos
Erich Gonzales and Mike Tan
Sitti
Dino Imperial and Bangs Garcia

Railey Valeroso and Chynna Ortaleza
Sarah Geronimo
Gian Magdangal
Matt Evans and Melissa Ricks
Martin Nievera
Paolo Paraiso and Say Alonzo
Gerald Anderson and Kim Chiu
Rodjun Cruz and Megan Young
John Lloyd Cruz and Bea Alonzo
Dolphy

Faces of the night
Marian Rivera and Aga Muhlach

Awards

Major awards
Box Office King - John Lloyd Cruz (One More Chance)
Box Office Queen - Bea Alonzo (One More Chance)
Male Concert Performer of the Year - Martin Nievera
Female Concert Performer of the Year - Sarah Geronimo
Male Recording Artist of the Year - Piolo Pascual
Female Recording Artist of the Year - Sitti

Film and Television category
Film Actor of the Year - Aga Muhlach (A Love Story)
Film Actress of the Year - Maricel Soriano (A Love Story)
Prince of Philippine Movies - Richard Gutierrez (The Promise)
Princess of Philippine Movies - Angel Locsin (The Promise)
Most Popular Film Producer - Star Cinema
Most Popular Screenwriter - Carmi Raymundo & Vanessa Valdez (One More Chance)
Most Popular Film Director - Cathy Garcia Molina (One More Chance)
Most Promising Male Star - Mart Escudero (GMA-7)
Most Promising Female Star - Marian Rivera (GMA-7)
Most Popular Loveteam of RP Movies & TV - Gerald Anderson & Kim Chiu (ABS-CBN)
Most Popular Male Child Performer - Makisig Morales (ABS-CBN)
Most Popular Female Child Performer - Kiray Celis (ABS-CBN)
Most Popular TV Program - Marimar (GMA-7)
Most Popular TV Director/s - Joyce Bernal & Mac Alejandre (Marimar - GMA-7)

Music category
Most Promising Male Singer - Gian Magdangal
Most Promising Female Singer - Aicelle Santos
Most Popular Recording Group - Bamboo
Most Promising Recording Group - Calla Lily
Most Popular Novelty Singer - Joey de Leon
Most Popular Dance Group - EB Babes

Special Awards
Phenomenal TV Star - Marian Rivera
All Time Box Office King - Vic Sotto (four-time consecutive Box Office King from 2004-2007)
King of Valentine Movies - Richard Gutierrez (4 consecutive years playing the male lead role in four Valentine movies)
Outstanding Achievement by a Female Recording Artist - Sharon Cuneta (Isn't It Romantic 2 album reached double platinum status on its release)

Multiple Awards

Companies with multiple awards 
The following companies received two or more awards in the television category:

References

Box Office Entertainment Awards
2008 film awards
2008 television awards
2008 music awards